Medical device regulation may refer to:

 Regulation (EU) 2017/745 in the European Union
 Medical Device Regulation Act of 1976 in the United States